Leylâ Sayar (December 27, 1939 – July 22, 2016) was a Turkish actress, author, ballerina, beauty queen, and singer of Circassian and Macedonian Turkish descent. Sayar was considered to be one of the most beautiful women of the Cinema of Turkey.

Early life and career

Sayar was born in 1939 to Circassian mother and Macedonian Turkish father from İstanbul. Before pursuing an acting career, she attended the American Academy for Girls. In 1957, she was crowned Miss Cinema Star. Leyla Sayar briefly held the first runner-up title for the beauty pageant Miss Turkey. She also finished first in the Miss Beach Beauty competition.

She took acting lessons at the Turkish State Theatre in Ankara. Between 1957 and 1976, she has acted in 170 films. Her aunt was married to a business magnate from the United States, and this contact led Leyla Sayar to get offers abroad. However, she steadfastly refused calls from Hollywood.

In the late 1950s, despite rumors that Leyla Sayar and Muzaffer Tema would be married were circulated, she dated Göksel Arsoy briefly after her breakup with Tema.

In 1976, Sayar renounced her career and devoted herself to religion and charity. From then on, she has not used any electronic appliances or devices.

Leyla Sayar released various books, including Altın Kalem, Erdemin Sırları, Meleğin Sözleri, Mühür, and Mürşit.

Publications

Books
 Altın Kalem
Erdemin Sırları
 Meleğin Sözleri (2002)
Mühür
Mürşit

Selected filmography

Film

References

External links
 

1939 births
2016 deaths
Turkish film actresses
Actresses from Istanbul
Turkish people of Circassian descent
Macedonian Turks
Turkish female erotic dancers